F.B.I. is the second studio album by the American rap group the Dayton Family, from Flint, Michigan. It was released on October 1, 1996, via Relativity Records. Recording sessions took place at Silver Sun Recording Studio in Flint. Production was handled by Steve Pitts with the members of Dayton Family serving as co-producers. It features guest appearances from Lorie Coleman, Esham, and Night & Day. Albums' title, "F.B.I." stands for "Fuck Being Indicted".

The album peaked at number 45 on the Billboard 200 albums chart and at number 7 on the Top R&B/Hip-Hop Albums chart in the United States.

Track listing 

Sample credits
Track 3 contains elements from "Let's Straighten It Out" by Latimore
Track 4 contains elements from "Friends" by Whodini
Track 13 contains elements from "Float On" by The Floaters

Personnel
Ira "Bootleg" Dorsey – main artist, co-producer
Raheen "Shoestring" Peterson – main artist, co-producer
Erick "Ghetto-E" Dorsey – main artist
Tonyatta Martinez – featured artist (tracks: 2, 5, 7, 12, 13)
Gasner Hughes – featured artist (tracks: 2, 5, 7, 12, 13)
Lorie Coleman – featured artist (tracks: 3, 11)
Esham Attica Smith – featured artist (track 5)
Steve Pitts – producer
Bernard Terry – mixing
Neil Perry – engineering
Neil Gehringer – mastering
Bobby Russell – project coordinator
Patrick Aquintey – design
Christian Lantry – photography

Chart history

References

External links 

1996 albums
The Dayton Family albums